Meandrina meandrites, commonly known as maze coral, is a species of colonial stony coral in the family Meandrinidae. It is found primarily on outer coral reef slopes in the Caribbean Sea and the Gulf of Mexico.

Description
Some small colonies are cone-shaped and are not attached to the substrate. These resemble young colonies of rose coral (Manicina areolata) and may be found in sandy or muddy areas some way from reefs. The raised walls between the corallites are formed from fine but widely separated transverse ridges called septa and meander over the surface of the coral. There is a slight indentation running along the crest of the walls where the septa from adjoining corallites meet. The polyps are large but are only protruded at night when they cover and obscure the skeleton of the coral.

Distribution and habitat
Meandrina meandrites is found in Bermuda, Florida, the Caribbean Sea, the Gulf of Mexico and the Bahamas. It mainly occurs on the seaward sides of reefs but does also occur on back slopes. It tolerates locations with high levels of sedimentation and turbidity. It is generally  the coral most frequently seen in the deeper parts of its range.

Status
The IUCN Red List of Threatened Species lists Meandrina meandrites as being of "Least Concern". This is because, although it is effected by coral bleaching, it is more resistant than some other species and usually recovers. It is also subject to coral diseases such as white plague and black band disease. Another factor that helps to maintain populations is the high level of recruitment of juvenile corals  which is in contrast to the recruitment failures of the pineapple coral (Dichocoenia stokesi). The chief threats it faces, as do other reef corals, are raised sea temperatures, ocean acidification and reef destruction. It is present in a number of marine parks which gives it some level of protection.

References

Meandrinidae
Corals described in 1758
Taxa named by Carl Linnaeus